Hepatocyte nuclear factor 3-gamma (HNF-3G), also known as forkhead box protein A3 (FOXA3) or transcription factor 3G (TCF-3G) is a protein that in humans is encoded by the FOXA3 gene.

Function 

HNF-3G is a member of the forkhead class of DNA-binding proteins. These hepatocyte nuclear factors are transcriptional activators for liver-specific transcripts such as albumin and transthyretin, and they also interact with chromatin. Similar family members in mice have roles in the regulation of metabolism and in the differentiation of the pancreas and liver.

References

Further reading

External links 
 

Forkhead transcription factors